Henriette Moller (born November 20, 1972 in Mossel Bay, Western Cape) is a South African judoka, who competed in the women's half-middleweight category. She picked up a total of twelve medals in her career, including a silver from the 2004 African Judo Championships in Tunis, Tunisia and a bronze from the 1999 All-Africa Games in Johannesburg, and represented her nation South Africa in the 63-kg class at the 2004 Summer Olympics.

Moller qualified as a lone judoka for the South African squad in the women's half-middleweight class (63 kg) at the 2004 Summer Olympics in Athens, by placing second and granting a berth from the African Championships in Tunis, Tunisia. Moller received a bye in the first round, but fell short in a pulverizing ippon defeat and an ippon seoi nage (one-arm shoulder throw) to North Korea's Hong Ok-song one minute and twenty-two seconds into her subsequent match.

References

External links

News24 Profile

1972 births
Living people
South African female judoka
Olympic judoka of South Africa
Judoka at the 2004 Summer Olympics
People from Mossel Bay
African Games medalists in judo
African Games bronze medalists for South Africa
Competitors at the 1999 All-Africa Games
Sportspeople from the Western Cape
20th-century South African women
21st-century South African women